NBA on TNT is a branding used for broadcasts of the National Basketball Association (NBA) games, produced by Warner Bros. Discovery Sports, the sports division of the Warner Bros. Discovery Sports subsidiary of Warner Bros. Discovery and televised on TNT since 1989. TNT's NBA coverage includes the Inside the NBA studio show, weekly doubleheaders throughout the regular season on Tuesdays and Thursdays (the latter of which starts in the winter to avoid clashing with the National Football League's Thursday Night Football), a majority of games during the first two rounds of the playoffs, and one conference finals series.

Coverage

Overview
TNT airs many of the NBA's marquee games (the NBA All-Star Game, a full Conference Final, Opening Night games, and the vast majority of playoff games).  In recent years, fans have reckoned it as what NBC was doing throughout that network's coverage of the league. From 2003 to 2005, TNT aired the Conference Final with the most interest from the national media (Mavericks–Spurs in 2003, Lakers-Wolves in 2004 and Pistons–Heat in 2005). TNT also airs most of the big games during the regular season (TNT aired a Lakers–Heat game for the third straight year in 2007), and TNT studio content is streamed to NBA.com via the TNT Overtime section.

Studio team

Ernie Johnson has been TNT's NBA studio host since the 1990–1991 season.  Currently, Johnson is joined by Shaquille O'Neal, Kenny Smith, and Charles Barkley. The NBA postgame show which features the four, Inside the NBA, has gained popularity in recent years for the chemistry and banter they have. Occasionally, Johnson, O'Neal, Smith and Barkley are joined by Draymond Green.

Playoff coverage
TNT's playoff coverage is nicknamed 40 Games in 40 Nights. During the first round, TNT airs games from Sunday to Thursday nights, with occasional broadcasts on Saturdays. In the second round, TNT airs playoff games from Sunday to Wednesday nights.

In previous years, TNT and TBS aired doubleheaders opposite each other on each night of the first round of the playoffs, with one network airing a doubleheader at 7:00 p.m. and 9:30 p.m. and the other network airing a doubleheader at 8:00 p.m. and 10:30 p.m. (all times Eastern).

TNT also carries exclusive coverage of one NBA Conference Final. Since the 2004 NBA playoffs, TNT has aired the Eastern Conference Finals in odd-number years and the Western Conference Finals in even-number years, a pattern which will continue until the expiration of its television contract. ESPN airs the other Conference Final, with weekend coverage of the ESPN-covered series and the Finals being broadcast on ABC.

For the first round, TNT's coverage of the playoffs is not exclusive; regional sports networks can still carry a local call and presentation of their team's games. After the first round, only national coverage from TNT or ESPN/ABC is produced.

2000–2002

Starting in 2000, the NBA spread out playoff series so that only two series would play per day (so as to avoid TNT and TBS competing for ratings). TNT would air doubleheaders on most weekdays, while TBS would air one doubleheader per week (in 2002, TBS aired doubleheaders every Tuesday night of the playoffs until the Conference Finals).

Since 2003
With the advent of the new NBA television deal in 2003 (which ended TBS's coverage), TNT has aired playoff games alone, including (in 2003 only) some weekday tripleheaders. The tripleheaders, which were criticized by both fans and many in the media, consisted of one game at 6:00 p.m., another at 8:30 p.m., and a final game at 11:00 p.m. After 2003, the NBA and TNT discontinued the tripleheaders, instead settling for a doubleheader on TNT and a single game on NBA TV simultaneously. However, when Turner Sports acquired NBA TV in 2008, the network abandoned airing the lone non-national Thursday game, instead leaving it up to the local sports networks. However, TBS may still air the start of the second game in case the ongoing first game on TNT extends beyond the tip-off time of the second game.

Other than their regular Thursday schedule, TNT also airs NBA regular season games on Martin Luther King Day, during which tripleheaders were still used. However, in 2011, ESPN opted to air one matinee game on MLK Day, and NBA TV on the second matinee, leaving TNT to air the remaining two night games. In 2008, TNT broadcast on Christmas Day for the first time as Marv Albert, Mike Fratello and Craig Sager broadcast the game between the Washington Wizards and the Cleveland Cavaliers in Quicken Loans Arena and Kevin Harlan, Reggie Miller and Cheryl Miller broadcast the game between the Dallas Mavericks and the Portland Trail Blazers in Rose Garden. Albert (himself a former Knicks broadcaster) and Steve Kerr called the game.

Due to TNT's part in coverage of the NCAA Division I men's basketball tournament beginning in March 2011, the league shifted over what would have been the Thursday night games in the third week of that month to Monday nights and they aired as part of ESPN's coverage instead. In addition, NBA TV's 'Fan Night' games gave way to TNT on select Tuesday nights.

Normally the studio crew of Ernie Johnson, Kenny Smith and Charles Barkley would stay in the TNT Atlanta studios for all of the regular season and the first two rounds of the playoffs. However, in the 2010-11 NBA season the studio crew started taking their pre-game, halftime and Inside the NBA shows on the road in the regular season, specifically select games involving the Miami Heat on TNT, due to the heightened media coverage surrounding the Heat's acquisitions of LeBron James and Chris Bosh. The substitute studio hosts will also be on hand for Inside the NBA and the other game's pre-game and halftime presentations; the "backup" crew at the time consisted of Matt Winer, Chris Webber and Kevin McHale.

On May 11, 2011, Turner Sports (this includes TBS) broadcast its 1,000th playoff telecast.

In July 2011, it was announced that Shaquille O'Neal would join as an analyst and he signed a multi-year agreement.

For the 2012–13 season and several seasons afterward, Charles Barkley occasionally filled in as a game analyst for select games. During his studio absences, Chris Webber normally served as an interim studio analyst. On April 11, 2013, TNT experimented with a three-man booth, but without a play-by-play announcer, for the game between the Warriors and the Thunder. Webber, Reggie Miller, and Steve Kerr, fresh off calling the 2013 NCAA Division I Men's Basketball National Championship Game for CBS Sports the Monday before, worked that game. That would end up being a lead-in to TNT broadcasting games with only former NBA and WNBA players calling them in 2017. For the 2014–15 season, TNT updated their graphics package.

For the 2015–16 season, the NBA and Turner Sports partnered with NextVR to stream the Warriors vs. Pelicans, the first-ever game to be broadcast live in virtual reality.

For the 2016–17 season, TNT announced that it would air a new series of Monday-night doubleheaders during the later half of the season, beginning on January 16, 2017. Monday night games from February 27 to March 27 were branded as Players Only broadcasts, featuring only former NBA players and without a traditional play-by-play announcer. Additionally, TNT announced that it would hold a "Road Show" tour in various cities throughout the season, which would feature fan experiences and festivities, and a live broadcast of Inside the NBA on-location. The tour began in Cleveland outside the Quicken Loans Arena, host of TNT's opening night game featuring the Cleveland Cavaliers.

TNT normally aired NBA Christmas Day games only if it falls on a Thursday (except during the 2011–12 season). However, the network announced that they would air a Christmas Day game on December 25, 2017 (a Monday) featuring the Minnesota Timberwolves and the Los Angeles Lakers. It also marked the first time that the Inside the NBA crew of Ernie Johnson, Kenny Smith, Charles Barkley and Shaquille O'Neal called an NBA regular-season game together. TNT also announced that the Players Only games would now air every Tuesday starting January 23; the franchise also expanded to include Tuesday night games on NBA TV during the first half of the season.

For the 2019–20 season, Stan Van Gundy joined the network as a color commentator. TNT also announced plans to reformat its Tuesday games, dropping the Players Only concept. The pre-game and halftime shows will have a larger focus on social media interaction, "culture", and "style", while Dwyane Wade, Candace Parker, Shaquille O'Neal, and Bleacher Report's Adam Lefkoe will serve as panelists. The new studio panel was originally intended to premiere with a doubleheader on January 28, 2020. However, due to the death of Kobe Bryant the previous Sunday (which led to the postponement of a Clippers-Lakers game scheduled to be televised as part of the doubleheader), the premiere was delayed to February 4, and the remaining game was instead preceded by a special edition of Inside the NBA from Staples Center, covering the aftermath of Bryant's death. The Tuesday postgame shows initially carried the Inside the NBA brand, but the 2020–21 season saw the program rebrand simply as the NBA on TNT Postgame Show.

During the 2020 NBA Bubble, lead voice Marv Albert opted out of TNT's coverage due to his advanced age, citing possible risk of illness caused by COVID-19. With secondary voice Kevin Harlan and backup announcer Ian Eagle leaving the bubble in September to join CBS' NFL coverage, TNT chose Brian Anderson to call that season's Western Conference Finals.

Lead play-by-play voice Marv Albert announced his retirement at the end of the 2021 NBA playoffs. Albert's final assignment with TNT took place in the 2021 Eastern Conference Finals.

Starting with the 2021–22 season, TNT's flagship doubleheaders and Inside the NBA moved to Tuesday nights during the NFL regular season. Despite scheduling a Thursday night doubleheader on opening week, TNT would not air another Thursday night doubleheader until January. TNT will continue to air Tuesday night doubleheaders after the NFL season ends, but with the secondary studio team (feat. Adam Lefkoe, Candace Parker and Dwyane Wade) hosting its pregame and postgame shows instead of the usual Inside the NBA crew. In recent years, TNT's Thursday night NBA games ran opposite Thursday Night Football during the autumn, and after the NFL signed network television contracts with CBS, NBC and Fox to carry the package alongside NFL Network, TNT booked less desirable matchups in its Thursday night slate to avoid competing with football. Even though TNF moved to an internet-exclusive broadcast (except on local stations of the featured teams) on Amazon Prime in 2022, TNT did not change its newly-implemented schedule of not airing NBA games (except on opening week) on Thursdays during the NFL season. With the NFL moving one of their Super Wild Card games to Monday Night, TNT reduced its Martin Luther King Jr. slate to a doubleheader to avoid competition, with NBA TV airing the nightcap. TNT also added a special Sunday night doubleheader on the final day of the regular season.

During the course of the season, TNT anointed Kevin Harlan as its new lead play-by-play voice, assigning him to call the 2022 NBA All-Star Game and the Western Conference Finals.

Canadian coverage
Although TNT does not broadcast in Canada, NBA on TNT games are regularly shown on TSN, Sportsnet, and NBA TV Canada.  However, if the Toronto Raptors are featured, then the Canadian broadcast of the game is shown.

Game commentary

The current NBA on TNT commentating roster includes Kevin Harlan, Brian Anderson, Ian Eagle, and Spero Dedes for play-by-play. Harlan and Anderson normally calls Thursday games, while the latter also usually works Tuesday games with Eagle. Dedes usually fills in occasionally for both Tuesday and Thursday games, but mainly call games for TNT during the NBA Playoffs.

Reggie Miller is the main color commentator, and is assigned to work Thursday games along with Stan Van Gundy. Van Gundy, Jim Jackson and Grant Hill contribute as the main game analysts for Tuesday games.

As of the 2021-22 season, the sideline reporter role is rotated between Allie LaForce, Stephanie Ready, Jared Greenberg, and Chris Haynes. Rebecca Haarlow, Nabil Karim, Dennis Scott, and Matt Winer join the rotation for the NBA Playoffs.

Ernie Johnson controls the main studio hosting duties on Thursdays, with Bleacher Report’s Adam Lefkoe serving that role on Tuesdays. Occasionally, whenever Johnson is away for other assignments, most notably March Madness, or personal reasons, Lefkoe, Matt Winer, Nabil Karim, or Kevin Frazier will fill in for Johnson, and vice versa for Lefkoe. Studio coverage is usually contributed by Shaquille O’Neal, Kenny Smith, and Charles Barkley on Thursdays, with O’Neal, Candace Parker, and Jamal Crawford contributing on Tuesdays. Parker and Crawford, along with Draymond Green and other analysts will contribute to the studio show at times.

Prior to his death on December 15, 2016, Craig Sager served a variety of roles on TNT, most prominently as a sideline reporter. Sager was usually paired with Cheryl Miller on most doubleheaders from 1997 to 2013.

Before he was hired as head coach of the Golden State Warriors in 2014, Steve Kerr was the primary game analyst on TNT. Kerr served that role from 2003 to 2006, and again from 2010 to 2014; in between he served as general manager of the Phoenix Suns.

Prior to leaving Turner before the 2021 NBA playoffs, Hall of Fame forward Chris Webber had been tapped as a co-lead analyst, and fill-in studio analyst from 2008-2021. Webber and Turner had parted ways without any contract renewal negotiations. A contributing factor may have been the fact that Turner bosses were angered with Webber, after he let them know very late that he wanted to opt out of working the 2021 NCAA tournament, which Turner has shared rights to with CBS Sports. Because of that, Turner and CBS did not have the announcements of its broadcast teams during their press conference to preview the NCAA Tournament like they usually did in years past.

Miami Heat legend Dwyane Wade was part of the Tuesday studio team for three seasons beginning in 2019, but left to pursue other business ventures.

Doug Collins used to be the secondary analyst on TNT; he was also the lead analyst in his first stint with the network from 1989 to 1995, pairing with the likes of Bob Neal, Ron Thulin and Pete Van Wieren. In his second stint from 2003 to 2010, he was usually paired with Harlan during the regular season, but was also paired with Albert during the NBA All-Star Game and the Conference Finals.

The original voice of the NBA on TNT was Bob Neal, who worked with the network from 1989 to 1995; he was also the original voice of the NBA on TBS. Other announcers who worked for TNT include Rick Barry, Hubie Brown, Dick Stockton, Verne Lundquist, Chuck Daly, Danny Ainge, Reggie Theus, Rex Chapman, John Thompson, Jeff Van Gundy, P. J. Carlesimo, Gary Bender, Matt Devlin, Joel Meyers and Kevin Calabro.

Several prominent NBA analysts have chosen TNT over ABC or ESPN, such as Collins and Charles Barkley (Barkley was not only approached by ABC about an NBA studio job in 2002, but as also rumored to have been approached for a job on Monday Night Football). Reggie Miller was also sought out by ABC and ESPN, only to go to TNT.

The biggest acquisition TNT made, once sought out by ABC and ESPN, was Marv Albert. After the 2002 NBA Finals, Albert, along with Bob Costas, essentially a free agent, was a candidate for the lead spot on The NBA on ABC (which ultimately went to Brad Nessler). As Costas elected to remain with NBC, Albert, hired by TNT in 1999, decided to stay with the network. Some attributed this to TNT having given Albert his first chance to be on national television after the sex scandal that led to his firing at NBC. Albert and Mike Fratello—both of whom worked as a team in the NBA on NBCs early years—would ultimately reunite on TNT.

Hubie Brown and Jeff Van Gundy are currently the only former TNT announcers working for ESPN/ABC. Brown, whose role on TNT was going to be significantly reduced starting with the 2002–03 season, left in 2002 to coach the Memphis Grizzlies. After two seasons of coaching, he left Memphis in early 2004 (leading to the departure from TNT of lead analyst Mike Fratello, who replaced him in Memphis) and was quickly picked up by ABC. Jeff Van Gundy, who was fired by the Houston Rockets after they lost in the first round, joined ABC at the beginning of the Western Conference Finals. Doug Collins, who resigned from TNT to become the Philadelphia 76ers head coach in 2010, joined ESPN after resigning from the 76ers three years later and left ESPN in 2017 to work with the Chicago Bulls. Part-time TNT broadcaster Mike Breen is now the lead broadcaster for ABC and one-time TNT analyst Doc Rivers worked for ABC in 2004. Meanwhile, Pam Oliver, the then-lead sideline reporter for Fox NFL, joined Turner Sports in 2004 as she would only be on during the NBA Playoffs, a role she fulfilled until 2009.

Music

TNT's current NBA game theme was written by composer Trevor Rabin. Previous themes for TNT were composed by Edd Kalehoff, Big Bad Voodoo Daddy, Jimmy Jam and Terry Lewis.

Contract history

The NBA on TNT is the network's longest-running regular program and sporting event, dating back to only a year after TNT's October 3, 1988 launch, with TNT also being the current longest-running NBA coverage partner. On October 6, 2014, Turner Sports and the NBA renewed their television and digital rights agreements through 2025.

In media

In the video game NBA 07, made by Sony Computer Entertainment for the PlayStation 2, PlayStation Portable and PlayStation 3 consoles, graphics for TNT's NBA games are seen when playing an exhibition, playoff, preseason, or seasonal game.

A direct copy of TNT's graphics can also be seen on Cartoon Network's weekly basketball program, Run It Back, a program similar to Inside Stuff.

See also
NBA on ABC
NBA on ESPN
NBA on NBC (defunct)

References

External links 
 
 
 NBA on TNT on TV.com
 Sports Media Watch: NBA on TNT

1989 American television series debuts
1990s American television series
2000s American television series
2010s American television series
2020s American television series
TNT
TNT (American TV network)
TNT (American TV network) original programming
Turner Sports